Munjeong-dong Rodeo Street is a major outlet shopping center in Seoul, South Korea. Clothing of many types is found here, some at substantially discounted rates.  Most of the major Korean labels have stores here, as do many international brands.

Due to lack of available streetside space, many stores are located on the basement, 2nd and 3rd floors.  One may pick up a map with store locations at the tourist office located on the main street.

This area is accessible from Exit 1 of Munjeong station, a station on Line 8 of the Seoul Subway.

See also
Apgujeong-dong
Cheongdam-dong

References

External links

Neighbourhoods of Songpa District
Shopping malls in South Korea